The Great Adventure is the third studio album by American progressive rock supergroup The Neal Morse Band, released on January 25, 2019 via Metal Blade Records and Radiant Records.

A concept album, it is a sequel to 2016's The Similitude of a Dream and both are loosely based on The Pilgrim's Progress by John Bunyan, besides having similar covers. This album follows the protagonist's family as they journey to Celestial City to join him. It is divided in five chapters, each ranging from 13 to 31 minutes long and involving from 2 to 6 songs, some of them evoking earlier melodies or preluding future ones.

The album's first and third singles, "Welcome to the World" and "I Got to Run", premiered on Progs website on December 8, 2018 and January 24, 2019, respectively. The second single, "Vanity Fair", was released with a lyric video on January 18, 2019. Videos for the title track and for "Welcome to the World 2" were released on December 18, 2018 and January 11, 2019, respectively.

The album was released as a two-CD package, a special edition with a bonus DVD featuring behind-the-scenes/making of videos, and as a triple vinyl version.

Background and writing 

Morse was not willing to create a sequel to The Similitude of a Dream at first, and neither was the band. Members were also against creating another double album. The quintet got together in August 2017 and then in January 2018 to perform some songs. Later in 2018, as Morse toured his solo album Life and Times, he revisited the recordings and used Pro Tools to work on the songs, ultimately creating a 2.5-hour version of the original album, which was well received by the band.

Morse says there are "three or even four" versions of the album recorded as demos and that the record spent 18 months in the making. The final cut of the effort was finished in August 2018, when a 2.5 hour version of it was shortened to just under two hours. Many songs and parts had to be cut, with Morse commenting that "everybody lost something that they loved on this album. And everybody gained." The band barely made it in time for a January 2019 release. Some songs, such as the closing track "A Love That Never Dies" and "Vanity Fair", had been written long before the sessions.

The album's title was suggested by drummer and vocalist Mike Portnoy, based on the last line of The Similitude of a Dream, which says "let the great adventure now begin".

Critical reception

Writing for Jesus Wired, David C. Coleman said "the members of the band musically complement each other to an extraordinary degree, creating a whole far greater than the individual parts" and pondered that "overall, The Great Adventure is not quite as earth-shattering as the career-defining The Similitude of a Dream but it's still a remarkable accomplishment and fitting conclusion for the tale of The Pilgrim's Progress.

On Sea of Tranquility, Pete Pardo said the album is "perhaps even more proggy and certainly heavier" than The Similitude of a Dream. He praised all members' performances and finished his review by saying "while it's no doubt a little early yet to make any claims [about the album being better than its predecessor], The Great Adventure easily comes pretty damn close."

Scott Medina from Sonic Perspectives said that "sonically, the band has never sounded better. The production is flawless" and that "the collective known as The Neal Morse Band rises to the formidable task of matching their most celebrated work, The Similitude of a Dream, proving they continue to grow and heighten the quality of their musical output."

PopMatters ranked it as the eighth best progressive rock/metal release of 2019.

Track listing

Act I (CD 1)

Act II (CD 2)

Personnel
The Neal Morse Band
 Neal Morse – lead vocals, keyboards, guitars
 Eric Gillette – guitars, lead vocals
 Mike Portnoy – drums, vocals
 Randy George – bass
 Bill Hubauer – organ, piano, synthesizers, lead vocals

Additional musicians
 Amy Pippin, Debbie Bresee, April Zachary, Julie Harrison – backing vocals on "A Love That Never Dies"
 Chris Carmichael – strings

Technical personnel
 Rich Mouser – mixing
 Jerry Guidroz – drum engineer

Charts

References

2019 albums
Music based on novels
Neal Morse albums
Concept albums
Metal Blade Records albums